Wolfgang Amadeus Mozart's Rondo in B for Violin and Orchestra, K. 269/261a, likely was composed between 1775 and 1777 as a replacement finale for the Violin Concerto No. 1, K. 207.

Like the Adagio in E and Rondo in C, the Rondo in B was requested by Italian violinist Antonio Brunetti and Mozart composed the new finale for that work. It is not performed as such by modern orchestras, however, but presented as a separate work that is performed by itself.

The work is scored for solo violin, two oboes, two horns, and strings.

Analysis

External links

Recording, Emmy Verhey, Concertgebouw Chamber Orchestra, Eduardo Marturet, Brilliant Classics – via NMA
Recording, Takako Nishizaki, Cappella Istropolitana, Johannes Wildner, Naxos Records – via NMA

Violin concertos by Wolfgang Amadeus Mozart
Compositions in B-flat major
1777 compositions